Yeovil was a rural district in Somerset, England, from 1894 to 1974.

It was created in 1894 under the Local Government Act 1894.

In 1974 it was abolished under the Local Government Act 1972 when it became part of South Somerset.

The parishes which were part of the district included Ash, Barwick, Brympton, Chilthorne Domer, Chilton Cantelo, Chiselborough, Closworth, East Chinnock, East Coker, Hardington Mandeville, Haselbury Plucknett, Ilchester, Limington, Long Load, Marston Magna, Martock, Montacute, Mudford, North Perrott, Norton Sub Hamdon, Odcombe, Rimpton, South Petherton, Stoke sub Hamdon, Tintinhull, West Camel, West Chinnock, West Coker, Yeovil Without and Yeovilton.

References

Yeovil Rural District at Britain Through Time
Local Government Act 1972

Districts of England created by the Local Government Act 1894
Districts of England abolished by the Local Government Act 1972
History of Somerset
Local government in Somerset
Rural districts of England